Yo Soy La Reina is an album by Puerto Rican merenguero Ashley, literally meaning "I am the Queen" in Spanish. The album went Gold and Platinum in sales.

Track listing 
 "Mala"
 "La Chica Del Swing"
 "El Nene Sexy"
 "Que Pena De Este Amor"
 "Yo Soy La Reina"
 "Todita Tuya"
 "Vete De Aqui"
 "Swing Mix"

Ashley (singer) albums
1997 albums